Sarchaveh (also Romanized as Sarchāveh; also known as Sarchāvā) is a village in Baryaji Rural District, in the Central District of Sardasht County, West Azerbaijan Province, Iran. At the 2006 census, its population was 110, in 19 families.

References 

Populated places in Sardasht County